Midwest Technical Institute (MTI) is a private for-profit trade school in Springfield, Illinois.  The college focuses on the mechanical trades, allied health, cosmetology, and commercial driving fields.

Midwest Technical Institute has branch campuses in East Peoria, Illinois, Moline, Illinois, Springfield, Illinois, and Springfield, Missouri. Delta Technical College is a branch school of Midwest Technical Institute.

References

External links

Vocational education in the United States
Educational institutions established in 1995
East Peoria, Illinois
Moline, Illinois
Education in Tazewell County, Illinois
Universities and colleges in Springfield, Illinois
For-profit universities and colleges in the United States
Private universities and colleges in Illinois
1995 establishments in Illinois